The 1938 Tour de France was the 32nd edition of the Tour de France, taking place from 5 to 31 July. It was composed of 21 stages over .The race was won by Italian cyclist Gino Bartali, who also won the mountains classification.

Innovations and changes
The bonification system was reduced compared to 1937: the winner of a stage now only received one minute bonification time, added by the margin to the second arriving cyclist, with a maximum of 75 seconds. The cyclists who reached a mountain top that counted towards the mountains classification first, now received only one minute bonification time.

The team trial stages, where the teams departed 15 minutes separately, were removed from the race. They would later return in the 1954 Tour de France, in a different form. Instead, the 1938 Tour de France featured two individual time trials.

In previous years, some cyclists were in teams and other rode individually. In 1937, there had been problems with individual cyclists being accused of helping other cyclists, culminating in the Belgian cyclists leaving the Tour. To avoid these problems, the categories for individual cyclists were removed for the 1938 Tour de France, and the race was contested by national teams. But because there were many French cyclists that did not fit into the national team, there were two extra French teams, the Bleuets and Cadets. The Bleuets was a kind of French "B"-team, while the Cadets consisted of young French promises.

Teams

The big cycling nations in 1938, Belgium, Italy, Germany and France, each sent a team of 12 cyclists. Other countries, Spain, Luxembourg, Switzerland and the Netherlands, sent smaller teams of six cyclists each. The French had two extra teams of 12 cyclists, the Cadets and Bleuets.

The three most powerful teams were the Belgian, the French and the Italian national team. The Italian team was led by Bartali, who had been close to winning the Tour de France in 1937 until he crashed. The Italian cycling federation had requested him to skip the 1938 Giro d'Italia so he could focus on the Tour de France.

The teams entering the race were:

 Belgium
 Italy
 Germany
 France
 Spain
 Switzerland
 Netherlands
 Luxembourg
 France Cadets
 France Bleuets

Route and stages

Race overview

Before the Pyrenees, all the favourites remained calm. André Leducq did not lose much time in the first stages, and when he got in a breakaway in the second part of the sixth stage, he took over the lead from Jean Majerus. In the eighth stage, Gino Bartali attacked, and dropped everybody. On the descent of the Col d'Aspin, his wheel collapsed, and Félicien Vervaecke and Ward Vissers overtook him. Bartali came back to finish in third place, but Vervaecke took the lead in the general classification. In that stage, former winner Georges Speicher was caught holding on to a car, and was removed from the race.

After that stage, Bartali was in second place in the general classification. He won some time on Vervaecke because of bonifications for reaching the tops of the Portet d'Aspet and the Braus first and winning the 11th stage, but lost some time in the individual time trial in stage 10b.

In the fourteenth stage, Bartali attacked again, and gained 17 minutes on Vervaecke and 20 on Vissers. Bartali was now leader of the race.
Before the next stage, Bartali felt poorly. His team director, Costante Girardengo, told him not to force himself. Bartali let the others get away on the first mountains, but during the descent of the Iseran, Bartali went as fast as he could, and reach his concurrents. During that stage, Mathias Clemens, who started the stage in second place, lost a lot of time, so Vervaecke was back in second place, 20 minutes behind Bartali.

In the rest of the race, Bartali defended his lead with ease. Vervaecke won back some time in the last individual time trial, but that was not enough to endanger Bartali's lead.

In the last stage, Antonin Magne (winner of the Tour de France in 1931 and 1934) and André Leducq (winner of the Tour de France in 1930 and 1932) escaped together, and crossed the finish line together. The Tour jury declared them both winner. This was Leducq's 25th and final stage victory. For both cyclists it was also the last stage they ever rode in the Tour de France.

Classification leadership and minor prizes

The time that each cyclist required to finish each stage was recorded, and these times were added together for the general classification. If a cyclist had received a time bonus, it was subtracted from this total; all time penalties were added to this total. The cyclist with the least accumulated time was the race leader, identified by the yellow jersey.

For the mountains classification, 12 mountains were selected by the Tour organisation. The Iseran was included for the first time in 1938. On the top of these mountains, ten points were given for the first cyclist to pass, nine points to the second cyclist, and so on, until the tenth cyclist who got one point. The mountains classification in 1938 was won by Gino Bartali. Bartali was the first cyclist to win the general classification and the mountains classification of the Tour de France in the same year.

The team classification was calculated in 1938 by adding up the times of the best three cyclists of a team; the team with the least time was the winner. In 1938, there were eight teams of twelve cyclists. Belgium, Italy, Germany and France had a team, Luxembourg and Switzerland both supplied six cyclists for a combined team, as did Spain and the Netherlands, and there were two extra French teams, the bleuets and the cadets. The bleuets were also described as "France B", and the cadets as "France C".

Final standings

General classification

Mountains classification

Team classification

Aftermath

Because of the political tensions in Europe before the Second World War, Italy did not send a team to the 1939 Tour de France, so Bartali was unable to defend his title. After the war, the Tour de France resumed in 1947. In 1948, Bartali won his second Tour, becoming the first and so far only cyclist to win editions of the Tour de France ten years apart.

Notes

References

Bibliography

External links

 
1938 in road cycling
1938 in French sport
1938
Tour de France